Centre d'Esports Manresa is a Spanish football team based in Manresa, in the autonomous community of Catalonia. Founded in 1916, it plays in Tercera División RFEF – Group 5, holding home games at Nou Estadi Municipal del Congost, with a capacity of 3,000 spectators.

History
The club was founded in 1906, but only in 1916 it adopted the current name Center d'Esports Manresa after the merge with the club Catalonia.

Season to season

40 seasons in Tercera División
1 season in Tercera División RFEF
1 season in Segunda Federación

Notable former players
 Joel Apezteguía
  Rubén Epitié
  Ángel Guirado

References

External links
Official website 

 
Football clubs in Catalonia
Association football clubs established in 1916
Divisiones Regionales de Fútbol clubs
1916 establishments in Spain